Sarbiewo may refer to the following places in Poland:

 Sarbiewo, Lubusz Voivodeship
 Sarbiewo, Masovian Voivodeship